Steffi Graf was the defending champion, but lost in the final to Arantxa Sánchez Vicario. The score was 7–5, 1–6, 7–6(7–4).

Seeds
The first nine seeds received a bye into the second round.

Draw

Finals

Top half

Section 1

Section 2

Bottom half

Section 3

Section 4

References

External links
 Official results archive (ITF)
 Official results archive (WTA)

1994 WTA Tour
1994 Canadian Open (tennis)